Chaturanga is an ancient Indian strategy game. While there is some uncertainty, the prevailing view among chess historians is that it is the common ancestor of the board games chess (European), xiangqi (Chinese), janggi (Korean), shogi (Japanese), sittuyin (Burmese), makruk (Thai), and modern Indian chess.

Chaturanga is first known from the Gupta Empire in India around the 6th century CE. In the 7th century, it was adopted as chatrang (shatranj) in Sassanid Persia, which in turn was the form of chess brought to late-medieval Europe. Archeological remains from 2000 to 3000 BC have been found from the city of Lothal (of the Indus Valley civilisation) of pieces on a board that resemble chess. According to Stewart Culin, chaturanga was first described in the Hindu text Bhavishya Purana. The Bhavishya Purana is known to include modern additions and interpolations, however, even mentioning British rule of India.

The exact rules of chaturanga are unknown. Chess historians suppose that the game had similar rules to those of its successor, shatranj. In particular, there is uncertainty as to the moves of the gaja (elephant).

Origin and etymology
The Sanskrit word chaturanga means "four-limbed" or "four arms", referring to ancient army divisions of infantry, cavalry, elephantry, and chariotry. The origin of chaturanga has been a puzzle for centuries. It has its origins in the Gupta Empire, with the earliest clear reference dating from the sixth century of the common era, and from north India.  The first substantial argument that chaturanga is much older than this is the fact that the chariot is the most powerful piece on the board, although chariots appear to have been obsolete in warfare for at least five or six centuries.  The counter-argument is that they remained prominent in literature.

History

Sanskrit  is a bahuvrihi compound word, meaning "having four limbs or parts" and in epic poetry often meaning "army". The name comes from a battle formation mentioned in the Indian epic Mahabharata. Chaturanga refers to four divisions of an army, namely elephantry, chariotry, cavalry and infantry. An ancient battle formation, akshauhini, is like the setup of chaturanga. 

Chaturanga was played on an 8×8 uncheckered board, called ashtāpada, which is also the name of a game. The board sometimes had special markings, the meaning of which are unknown today. These marks were not related to chaturanga, but were drawn on the board only by tradition. These special markings coincide with squares unreachable by any of the four gajas that start on the board due to movement rules. Chess historian H. J. R. Murray conjectured that the ashtāpada was also used for some old race-type dice game, perhaps similar to chowka bhara, in which the marks had meaning.

An early reference to an ancient Indian board game is sometimes attributed to Subandhu in his Vasavadatta, dated between the 5th and 7th centuries AD: The time of the rains played its game with frogs for pieces [nayadyutair] yellow and green in colour, as if mottled by lac, leapt up on the black field squares.

The colours are not those of the two camps, but mean that the frogs have two colours, yellow and green.

Banabhatta's Harsha Charitha (c. AD 625) contains the earliest reference to the name chaturanga: Under this monarch, only the bees quarrelled to collect the dew; the only feet cut off were those of measurements, and only from Ashtâpada one could learn how to draw up a chaturanga, there was no cutting-off of the four limbs of condemned criminals...

While there is little doubt that ashtâpada is the gameboard of 8×8 squares, the double meaning of chaturanga, as the four-folded army, may be controversial. There is a probability that the ancestor of chess was mentioned there.

The game was first introduced to the West in Thomas Hyde's De ludis orientalibus libri duo, published in 1694. Subsequently, translations of Sanskrit accounts of the game were published by Sir William Jones.

In Arabic, most of the terminology of chess is derived directly from chaturanga: Modern chess itself is called shatranj in Arabic, and the bishop is called the elephant. The Tamerlane chess was also introduced in Iran later.

Rules
The initial position is as shown. White moves first. The objective in chaturanga is to checkmate the opponent's Raja (king) or reducing the opposition to just the Raja.

Pieces and their moves

 Raja (king) (also spelled Rajah): moves one step in any direction (vertical, horizontal or diagonal), the same as the king in chess. There is no castling in chaturanga.
 Mantri (minister or counsellor); also known as Senapati (general): moves one step diagonally in any direction, like the fers in shatranj.
 Ratha (chariot) (also known as Śakata): moves the same as a rook in chess, whereby the rook moves horizontally or vertically, through any number of unoccupied squares.
 Gaja (elephant) (also known as Hastin): three different moves are described in ancient literature:
 Two squares in any diagonal direction, jumping over the first square, as the alfil in Iranian shatranj, Ethiopian senterej, Mongolian Tamerlane chess and medieval courier chess. This is a fairy chess piece that is a (2,2)-leaper. 
 The same move is used for the boat in Indian chaturaji, a four-player version of chaturanga.
 The elephant in Chinese xiangqi has the same move, but is not able to jump over an intervening piece or pawn. 
 The elephant in Korean janggi has a very similar move, also without the ability to jump over an intervening piece or pawn. 
 One step forward or one step in any diagonal direction.
 The same move is used for the khon (nobleman) in Thai makruk and the sin (elephant) in Burmese sittuyin, as well as for the silver general in Japanese shogi.
 The move was described c. 1030 by Biruni in his book India.
 Two squares in any orthogonal (vertical or horizontal) direction, jumping over the first square. 
 A piece with such a move is called a dabbābah in some chess variants. The move was described by the Arabic chess master al-Adli c. 840 in his (partly lost) chess work. (The Arabic word dabbāba in former times meant a covered siege engine for attacking walled fortifications; today it means "army tank".)
 This is reminiscent of the aforementioned chaturaji, where the elephant moves as a rook.
 The German historian Johannes Kohtz (1843–1918) suggests, rather, that this was the earliest move of the Ratha.
 Ashva (horse) (also spelled Ashwa or Asva): moves the same as a knight in chess.
 Padàti or Bhata (foot-soldier or infantry) (also spelled Pedati); also known as Sainik (warrior): moves and captures the same as a pawn in chess, but without a double-step option on the first move.

Additional rules
Al-Adli mentions two further rules:
 Stalemate was a win for a stalemated player. This rule appeared again in some medieval chess variants in England c. 1600. According to some sources, there was no stalemate, as the king is forced to move and consequently be captured.
 The player that is first to bare the opponent's king (i.e. capture all enemy pieces except the king) wins. In shatranj this is also a win, but only if the opponent cannot bare the player's king on his next turn.

See also

References

Further reading

External links

Chaturanga by Hans Bodlaender, The Chess Variant Pages
Chaturanga a simple program by Ed Friedlander (Java)

Abstract strategy games
History of chess
Chess in India
Games related to chaturanga
Traditional board games
Indian inventions
Traditional sports of India
Ancient sports
Indian board games